Anton Kaisti (born 17 May 1992) is a Finnish badminton player. He joined Finish national badminton team since 2007, then in 2014 he won a bronze medal at the European Men's Team Championships in Basel.

In 2013, he won mixed doubles event in Estonian International, Bulgaria Eurasia Open, Irish International, and Turkey International. He became the runner-up at the Irish International in men's singles event. In 2014, he won Norwegian International in men's doubles and mixed doubles. In 2015, for the first time of him won the men's singles event through Estonian International tournament. In 2016, he won Iceland International in mixed doubles with his partner from the Netherlands Cheryl Seinen.

Achievements

BWF International Challenge/Series (13 titles, 4 runners-up) 
Men's singles

Men's doubles

Mixed doubles

  BWF International Challenge tournament
  BWF International Series tournament
  BWF Future Series tournament

References

External links 
 

1992 births
Living people
Sportspeople from Helsinki
Finnish male badminton players
Badminton players at the 2019 European Games
European Games competitors for Finland
21st-century Finnish people